Punjab Prisons Staff Training Institute (PPSTI) is a provincial Government's training institute for subordinate prison staff of all Jails in Punjab in Pakistan. It operates under general command and control of the Inspector General of Prisons, Punjab. The institute is situated in a historical building formerly called "Craik Home" on Ferozepur Road in Lahore, Pakistan.

See also
 Government of Pakistan
 Punjab Prisons (Pakistan)
 National Police Academy of Pakistan
 National Academy for Prisons Administration
 Elite Police Training School
 Police College Sihala
 Central Jail Faisalabad
 Central Jail Lahore
 Central Jail Mianwali
 Prison Officer
 Central Jail Rawalpindi
 District Jail Rawalpindi

References

External links

Law enforcement in Pakistan
Government agencies of Punjab, Pakistan